Clara Udofa (born 31 January 1978) is a Nigerian former professional tennis player.

Udofa, originally from Calabar in Cross River State, trained under the tutelage of Godwin Kienka at his academy in Lagos. She became Nigeria's youngest ever national senior champion in 1992, at the age of 14. On the professional tour she achieved top 600 rankings in both singles and doubles. In 2003 she won the women's singles gold medal at the All-Africa Games, defeating Zimbabwe's Fadzai Mawisire in the final. This was Nigeria's first ever medal in this category and was won in front of home fans in Abuja, Nigeria. She also won a gold medal in the doubles competition.

ITF finals

Doubles: 1 (0–1)

References

External links
 
 
 

1978 births
Living people
Nigerian female tennis players
People from Calabar
African Games medalists in tennis
African Games gold medalists for Nigeria
Competitors at the 2003 All-Africa Games